Aoyama Dam  is an earthfill dam located in Hokkaido Prefecture in Japan. The dam is used for irrigation. The catchment area of the dam is 85.5 km2. The dam impounds about 162  ha of land when full and can store 15127 thousand cubic meters of water. The construction of the dam was started on 1951 and completed in 1962.

References

Dams in Hokkaido